Harry Bentley may refer to:

Harry Bentley (jockey) (born 1992), British jockey
Harry Bentley (footballer) (1891–1970), English footballer
Harry H. Bentley (1852–1922), Canadian politician
Harry Bentley (The Jeffersons), television character
Harry C. Bentley (1877–1967), founder and namesake of Bentley University

See also
Henry Bentley (disambiguation)